The 2009–10 G4S Korvpalli Meistriliiga was the 85th season of the Estonian basketball league and the first under the title sponsorship of G4S. Tallinna Kalev/Cramo came into the season as defending champions of the 2008–09 KML season.

The season started on 13 October 2009 and concluded on 14 May 2010 with TÜ/Rock defeating Rakvere Tarvas 4 games to 2 in the 2015 KML Finals to win their 25th Estonian League title.

Teams

Regular season

League table

Updated to match(es) played on 25 March 2010. Source: KML  (2009/2010)

Playoffs
The playoffs began on 28 March 2010 and ended on 14 May 2010. The tournament concluded with TÜ/Rock defeating Rakvere Tarvas 4 games to 2 in the 2010 KML Finals.

Bracket

Individual statistics
Players qualify to this category by having at least 50% games played.

Points

Rebounds

Assists

Awards

Finals MVP
  Janar Talts (TÜ/Rock)

Best Young Player
  Rain Veideman (Rakvere Tarvas)

Coach of the Year
  Andres Sõber (Rakvere Tarvas)

All-KML Team

References

Korvpalli Meistriliiga seasons
Estonian
KML